Anthony A. Henninger High School  is a high school in the Syracuse City School District.  Henninger is the largest of the four high schools in the district with an enrollment of approximately 1800 students.

History 
Henninger High School was built in the mid 1960s in order to merge two institutions in the area, North High School and Eastwood High School. The latter was in a neighborhood that was once a village and was later annexed by the city of Syracuse.

Originally, the school was going to be named Northeast High. However, by the time the school was finished, it was decided that the school would be named after the current mayor of Syracuse, Anthony A. Henninger.

Facilities 
The Henninger High School campus is home to a variety of facilities. The auditorium, once the temporary home of the now-defunct Syracuse Symphony Orchestra, was built to have excellent acoustics and seats around 950 people. The athletic complex includes two recently built turf fields, six tennis courts, two softball fields, one baseball field, four basketball courts, a quarter-mile track surrounding the main football field, an indoor pool, the Sunnycrest Ice Skating Rink and the Sunnycrest Golf Course.

Athletics 
Henninger participates in both boys and girls Section III, Class AA athletics. Henninger has many athletic programs including boys' basketball, football, lacrosse, bowling, soccer, tennis, hockey (through Corcoran High School), swimming (through Corcoran and Nottingham High Schools), golf, and track as well as girls' basketball, soccer, swimming, volleyball, tennis, bowling, lacrosse, track, and crew (with Corcoran and Nottingham High Schools).

Music/Fine Arts 
Henninger has four branches of its fine arts department: band, chorus, orchestra and drama.

Band
The Henninger Band performs in several venues annually. The pep band plays at all home basketball and football games. The marching band performs in several parades a year and is the only high school band that has performed in the annual Syracuse St. Patrick's Day Parade every year since the parade's establishment in 1985. In 2007, the band achieved first place out of all high school bands. Its successful Jazz Ensemble is well known throughout the area and goes to several competitions throughout the year. In 1996 and 1998, the Jazz Ensemble won National Invitational competitions in Myrtle Beach, SC with the trumpet section winning "Best Trumpet Section" in 1998. Several individual awards were also won by the lead trumpet player, pianist, and guitarist. The 2004-2005 Jazz Ensemble won several National Invitational competitions in Myrtle Beach, SC and Virginia Beach, VA, winning "Stellar Trumpet Section" and several individual awards were won including lead trumpet, Tee Nelson, and solo trumpet, Wayne Tucker. The Wind Ensemble, a select version of its main Concert Band traditionally plays a copy of the original arrangement of Leroy Anderson's Sleigh Ride.

Drama
The Henninger High School Drama Club puts on 2-3 performances a year. Unlike many high schools in the area, at least two of these performances are musicals. In the past several years, the Club has been particularly ambitious. In the spring of 2006, they performed the Syracuse area debut (High School and professional) of Elton John and Tim Rice's: Aida. In the fall of the same year they performed the Syracuse area debut of Disney's High School Musical.  In the spring of 2008 Henninger was the first high school in the area to do the musical, Miss Saigon. Other shows in recent years include Fiddler on the Roof in 2004, West Side Story in Fall 2007, and Once On This Island in Spring 2010.

Academics 
Henninger High School's academic program is different in that it is divided into various "focus teams."  The four main teams are Business, Media and Communications, Art Focus and Health Careers. The two largest teams, Health Careers and Art Focus are the only programs of their kind in the surrounding area. Health Careers in particular is a program aimed for students heading towards the medical profession. Benefits from Health Careers include many medical-based courses as well as volunteer work at local hospitals.

Henninger High School also has chapters in the National Honor Society, Tri-M Music Honor Society and the only chapter of the National Art Honor Society in Upstate New York

Notable alumni 
Andray Blatche – professional basketball player
Karl Buechner – metalcore vocalist for Earth Crisis, Freya and Path of Resistance
Andy Mineo – Christian hip hop artist
Joseph A. Nicoletti – Syracuse City Council and New York State Assembly representative
Jessimae Peluso – stand-up comedian and television personality from MTV's Girl Code
Tom Romano – professional baseball player
Ray Seals – professional football player
Lazarus Sims – professional basketball player
Marquise Walker – professional football player
Frank Whaley – actor, director, screenwriter and comedian

References

External links
Henninger High School Website
Current site

Public high schools in New York (state)
Schools in Onondaga County, New York
Syracuse City School District
1965 establishments in New York (state)
Educational institutions established in 1965